Garamduz-e Sharqi Rural District is in Garamduz District of Khoda Afarin County, East Azerbaijan province, Iran. At the National Census of 2006, its constituent villages were in Garamduz Rural District of Khoda Afarin District in Kaleybar County. There were 4,138 inhabitants in 1,021 households at the following census of 2011, by which time Khoda Afarin District had been elevated to the status of a county and divided into three parts: the Central District, Garamduz District, and Minjavan District. At the most recent census of 2016, the population of the rural district was 4,236 in 1,212 households. The largest of its 15 villages was Mahmudabad, with 1,138 people.

References 

Khoda Afarin County

Rural Districts of East Azerbaijan Province

Populated places in East Azerbaijan Province

Populated places in Khoda Afarin County

fa:دهستان گرمادوز شرقي